Two ships of the Confederate States Navy have been named General Quitman after several cities after John A. Quitman:

 , a Confederate States transport built c.1859, sank at Morganza, Louisiana on October 23, 1868
 , a gunboat of Confederate River Defense Fleet, probably built as the Galveston c.1857, burned to prevent capture on April 24, 1862

See also 
 River Defense Fleet

References 

Ship names
Naval ships of the Confederate States of America